General Jacob Edward Smart  (May 31, 1909 – November 12, 2006) was a general officer who served in United States Army during World War II and in the Air Force during the Cold War era.

Early life
Smart was born in Ridgeland, South Carolina, the son of a railroad conductor, and was educated in the public schools of South Carolina and Georgia, and at Marion Military Institute in Marion, Alabama.

Military career
Smart graduated from the United States Military Academy in 1931 as an Army flying officer and entered flight training with the Army Air Corps. He later became a flying instructor. When the United States entered World War II, Smart, a colonel at that time, was chief of staff for flight training at the Army Air Force headquarters in Washington, D.C..

World War II
Smart joined the Air Corps Advisory Council in July 1942, serving on the staff of General "Hap" Arnold, the chief of staff of the Army Air Force.  In this position, he was involved with the planning of the invasion of Europe and participated in the meeting between U.S. President Franklin D. Roosevelt and British Prime Minister Winston Churchill in Casablanca, Morocco in 1943.  He received the Legion of Merit for his services.

Smart was assigned to 9th Bomber Command in the Middle East in 1943.  He was the architect of Operation Tidal Wave, in which 178 B-24 Liberator heavy bombers from five bombardment groups of the 9th Army Air Force flew a 2,400-mile round trip from bases near Benghazi in Libya to perform a low-level bombing raid on the oil refineries at Ploieşti, Romania, on 1 August 1943.  Nearly 40% of the oil plant was destroyed, but 55 of the American planes were lost and another 50 severely damaged.  He received the Distinguished Service Medal; five other airmen received the Medal of Honor, the most for any single military action.  Despite its success, the plant was repaired and back to its original operating capacity within a month.

Smart attended the Army-Navy Staff College, graduating in February 1944.  He then joined the 15th Air Force in the Mediterranean Theater, commanding the 97th Bomb Group in Italy. Despite his knowledge of top secret issues, such as plans for the Normandy invasion, he was allowed to fly missions over enemy territory.

On his 29th mission, May 10, 1944, Smart was flying a B-17 Flying Fortress on a mission to bomb aircraft factories near Wiener Neustadt, Austria. The aircraft was hit by anti-aircraft fire and exploded. He was thrown from the wreck in mid-air but managed to open his parachute despite the wounds he had received from the explosion.  He landed and was immediately captured by the Germans and held as a prisoner of war until freed by the forces of General George S. Patton's Army on April 29, 1945. His captors knew he was important and did their best to extract secrets from him but Smart was able to  evade all their questions.

Upon his repatriation to the US, Smart returned to duty as a top aide to General Arnold, continuing as the U.S. Air Force was formed in 1947. He graduated from the National War College in June 1950, and commanded 32nd Air Division at Stewart Air Force Base in New York, and was later vice commander of Eastern Air Defense Force.

Postwar career
During the Korean War, Smart served as deputy for operations in the Far East Air Force where he showed his skill as a strategist.  He also flew several sorties, and was injured. He returned to Washington, D.C., in June 1955, as assistant vice chief of staff at U.S. Air Force Headquarters, and became commander of the Twelfth Air Force, Tactical Air Command, in September 1959.  He became vice commander of Tactical Air Command in  January 1960, based at Langley Air Force Base.  He served as Commander U.S. Forces in Japan from August 1961; and then as Commander of the Pacific Air Forces in Honolulu from August 1963.  He became Deputy Commander of the U.S. European Command in July 1964, and retired in July 1966.

Later life
Following his retirement, Smart served as an administrator with NASA for several years. He eventually returned to live in Ridgeland.

Smart died in his sleep from congestive heart failure at the age of 97 on Sunday, November 12, 2006, and was buried the following week on Thursday November 16, 2006.  He was divorced in 1946. He had four children; three daughters and a son.  He was predeceased by two daughters.

Awards and decorations
Smart received numerous decorations including: Distinguished Service Cross, Distinguished Service Medal, Distinguished Flying Cross, Legion of Merit and four awards of the Air Medal.  He was also awarded the decoration of Ulchi by the Republic of Korea, and was an honorary Knight Commander of the Order of the British Empire.

  Distinguished Service Cross
  Air Force Distinguished Service Medal
  Legion of Merit
  Distinguished Flying Cross
  Air Medal with three oak leaf clusters

References

Forged In Fire, DeWitt Copp, Doubleday, 1982  (episodes in the book trace Gen. Smart's service during World War II)

External links
Obituary, Washington Post, 16 November 2006
Obituary, The Times, 5 December 2006

 U.S. Air Force Website

1909 births
2006 deaths
United States Air Force generals
United States Army Air Forces generals
United States Army Air Forces pilots of World War II
United States Air Force personnel of the Korean War
World War II prisoners of war held by Germany
Recipients of the Distinguished Service Cross (United States)
Recipients of the Distinguished Flying Cross (United States)
Recipients of the Legion of Merit
Recipients of the Air Force Distinguished Service Medal
Recipients of the Air Medal
Marion Military Institute alumni
United States Military Academy alumni
People from Ridgeland, South Carolina